Escadabiidae is a small neotropical family of the harvestman infraorder Grassatores with six described species.

Description
Escadabiidae are about three millimeters long, with short legs and weak chelicerae.

Distribution
All known members of this group are endemic to Brazil. The as yet undescribed species in this family expand the range to the coast of Ceará State and caves in the dry central part of Minas Gerais, where the cave-dwelling species could represent an example of relictual distribution.

Relationships
Escadabiidae are possibly the sister group to Kimulidae.

Name
The name of the type genus Escadabius is combined from the type locality Escada (Pernambuco, Brazil) and Ancient Greek bios "living".

Species

 Baculigerus H. E. M. Soares, 1979
 Baculigerus litoris H. E. M. Soares, 1979
 Escadabius Roewer, 1949
 Escadabius schubarti Roewer, 1949
 Escadabius spinicoxa Roewer, 1949
 Escadabius ventricalcaratus Roewer, 1949
 Jim H. E. M. Soares, 1979
 Jim benignus H. E. M. Soares, 1979
 Recifesius H. E. M. Soares, 1978
 Recifesius pernambucanus H. E. M. Soares, 1978

Footnotes

References
 's Biology Catalog: Escadabiidae
  (eds.) (2007): Harvestmen - The Biology of Opiliones. Harvard University Press 

Harvestman families